Hessa bint Salman Al Khalifa (c. 1933 – 5 August 2009) was a member of the Bahraini royal family.

Marriage and children
Hessa bint Salman was the Queen consort and widow of the former Emir of Bahrain, Isa bin Salman Al Khalifa, who reigned from 1961 until his death in 1999. They married on 8 May 1949. She was the mother of the current King of Bahrain, Hamad bin Isa Al Khalifa, the couple's eldest son.

Activities
Hessa bint Salman was active in charitable causes during her life. The Gulf Daily News, a Bahraini newspaper, referred to her as a "pioneer" in the promotion of humanitarian causes within Bahrain and abroad. Some of Hessa bint Salman Al Khalifa's most noteworthy projects included the care of orphans, aid to women who were divorced or widowed, and the construction of new mosques in Bahrain.

Death and funeral
Hessa bint Salman Al Khalifa died on 4 August 2009 at the Al-Sakhir Palace in Bahrain. Her funeral was held on 6 August 2009 at the Isa bin Salman Grand Mosque in Riffa, Bahrain. Her funeral was attended by a number of dignitaries including her son, Hamad ibn Isa Al Khalifah, Khalifah ibn Salman Al Khalifah, Salman bin Hamad bin Isa Al Khalifa and other male members of the Al Khalifa family. Other officials, diplomats, parliamentarians and government ministers were also present.

Legacy
Hamad ibn Isa Al Khalifah announced that a new charity was to be established in his mother's name. The goal of the new charity would be to promote causes championed by his mother within Bahrain.

Patronages
 Honorary President of the Children & Mothers Welfare Society.
 Honorary President of the International Ladies Association.

References

1930s births
2009 deaths
Hessa Bint Salman
Spouses of national leaders
Date of birth missing